Data structure may refer to:https://datagoogledmpt.atlassian.net/plugins/servlet/mobile#filter/jql/labels%20%3D%20%22business-form%22
 Data structure, a way of efficiently storing and organizing data in a computer
 Data structure (blockchain), a method by which data can be verifiably stored on decentralized peer-to-peer network, where efficiency is not one of the properties achieved